Indian Rock is a tall peak on the Columbia Plateau in Washington, USA.  At  in elevation, it is the highest point in Klickitat County.

See also 

 Petroglyph Drawings by Native Americans on rocks

References 

Mountains of Washington (state)
Mountains of Klickitat County, Washington